Raffaella Calloni (born ) is an Italian female volleyball player, playing as a middle-blocker. She is part of the Italy women's national volleyball team.

She competed at the 2015 European Games in Baku. On club level she played for San Casciano Volley in 2015.

References

External links
cev.lu
legavolleyfemminile.it
leandrodesanctis
Zimbio

1983 births
Living people
Italian women's volleyball players
Place of birth missing (living people)
European Games competitors for Italy
Volleyball players at the 2015 European Games
Mediterranean Games bronze medalists for Italy
Mediterranean Games medalists in volleyball
Competitors at the 2005 Mediterranean Games
20th-century Italian women
21st-century Italian women